Lemon Love is the debut album recorded by pop singer Aslyn. All songs are written by Aslyn except "Here" which was co-written with her producer, Guy Chambers, and "493–1023" which was co-written with her brother Jeremy Mitchell. In its first week, Lemon Love sold almost 4,000 copies. The album went on to sell over 11,000 copies in the United States, reaching #36 on the Billboard Heatseekers chart.

Track listing
All songs by Aslyn except where noted.

"Just Enough" – 4:03
"Be The Girl" – 3:00
"Gotta Get Over You" – 3:57
"493-1023" – 3:42 (Aslyn, Jeremy Mitchell)
"Ain't No Love" – 3:29
"You Got Me" – 2:52
"Lemon Love" – 3:47
"Here's to Believe" – 4:22
"Rainbow" – 3:26
"Golden" – 3:57
"Wally" – 4:11
"Here" – 4:21 (Aslyn, Guy Chambers)
"You Got Me" (Fast Version *Japan bonus track*) (writer unknown)

In popular culture
The song "Be The Girl" can be heard in the video game Bratz: Rock Angelz.

References 

Aslyn albums
2005 debut albums
Albums produced by Eric Valentine